Maya Bouldry-Morrison, better known by her stage name Octo Octa, is an American house producer and DJ based in Brooklyn, New York.

In 2016, Bouldry-Morrison came out as transgender, after having already gained prominence as an artist.

Career 
Octo Octa describes her influences as including classic Warp records, IDM, drum 'n' bass, San Francisco based label Tigerbeat6, and has been inspired by trans artist DJ Sprinkles (a.k.a. Terre Thaemlitz).

While studying at the University of New Hampshire, she formed the dance band Horny Vampyre with her friend Jeremy, while also using the Octo Octa moniker for her solo experimental music. Her initial solo productions worked within IDM and breakcore genres; it was only at the end of her college career that she began to produce the style of house music for which she is more widely known.

Her first EP release, Let Me See You (2011), came out through 100% Silk, the house sub-label of noise music label Not Not Fun Records. She has since had several releases, including the 12" EP Where Did You Go / Through the Haze (2014) on Argot, More Times EP (2015) on German label Running Back and Further Trips (2015) through Deepblak. Her first three albums have been released through 100% Silk, with the most recent being Resonant Body in 2019.

In January 2021, Bouldry-Morrison announced her new EP She’s Calling, set for a February 5 release date.

Personal life 
Bouldry-Morrison came out as transgender in 2016. She recounts that this process began in 2012, when she read a Rolling Stone article about Against Me frontwoman Laura Jane Grace.

Discography

Albums 
 Resonant Body T4T LUV NRG, 2019, T4T002
 Where Are We Going? HNYTRX, 2017, HNY-015
 Between Two Selves 100% Silk, 2013, SILK046
 LA Vampires 100% Silk, 2012, SILK031
 Rough, Rugged, And Raw 100% Silk, 2011, SILK025

12"s and EPs 
 For Lovers Technicolour, 2019, TCLR030
 Devotion EP Naive (3), 2018, NAIVE004
 Adrift Honey Soundsystem Records, 2017, HNY-016
 Aimless Skylax, 2017, LAX144
 New Paths Argot, 2017, ARGOT019
 Frndzne 01 Frendzone!, 2017, frndzne 01
 My Feelings Toward You Love Notes, 2017, LVNO-09
 Where Are We Going? HNYTRX, 2017, HNY-015
 Further Trips Deepblak, 2015, DBR-V026
 Requiem for the Body Stays Underground It Pays, 2015, SUIT 8
 More Times Running Back, 2015, RB052
 Where Did You Go/ Through the Haze Argot, 2014, ARGOT 009
 Cause I Love You 100% Silk, 2014, SILK061
 Oh Love 100% Silk, 2012, SILK023
 Let Me See You 100% Silk, 2011, SILK011
 She's Calling, 2021

Remixes
 Don't Fear It EP Don't Fear It (Remix), Shewey Trax, 2017, shew-19

References 

Year of birth missing (living people)
Place of birth missing (living people)
Living people
American electronic musicians
American LGBT musicians
Transgender women musicians
LGBT DJs
American women in electronic music
Transgender musicians